Andy Walken (born April 26, 2006) is an American actor, known for his role as William Cleary in The Kids Are Alright and Ralphie Parker in A Christmas Story Live!. In 2022, he won the first-ever Children's and Family Emmy Award for Outstanding Younger Voice Performer in an Animated or Preschool Animated Program for his work as Young Durpleton in Centaurworld.

Personal life 
Originally from Mukilteo, Washington, Walken started as a competitive ice skater at the age of five and began his acting career in 2015 after being discovered at a national talent convention. He was cast as the lead role of Ralphie in Fox's A Christmas Story Live! in 2017.

Filmography

Film

Television

Video Games

Awards and nominations

References

External links 
 The Kids Are Alright bio
 Andy Walken on IMDb
 Andy Walken on Rotten Tomatoes

2006 births
Living people
American male child actors
Emmy Award winners
Male actors from Seattle